literally means "the black sea of trees," and may refer to:

another name for Aokigahara, the forest around Mount Fuji in Japan, sometimes simply called "jukai" ("Sea of Trees") 
a 1960 novel by Seichō Matsumoto, Kuroi Jukai